Canoe Place was a station stop along the Montauk Branch of the Long Island Rail Road and first opened as a low cinder platform on the south east side of Shinnecock Canal in 1935. The station was in service for "Fisherman's Special" trains and was closed in 1953. "Fisherman's Special" trains operated from Penn Station to Montauk and provided an intermediate stop at Canoe Place for boats waiting to take anglers out on Peconic Bay. The station was located between Hampton Bays and Suffolk Downs Stations. The hamlet where it was located is now part of Hampton Bays, New York.

References

Railway stations in the United States opened in 1935
Railway stations closed in 1953
1935 establishments in New York (state)
1953 disestablishments in New York (state)
Former Long Island Rail Road stations in Suffolk County, New York
Southampton (town), New York